Elijah Henry Just (born 1 May 2000) is a New Zealand professional footballer who plays as a winger for AC Horsens and the New Zealand national team.

Club career

Western Suburbs
Just joined the Olé Academy, then run by Declan Edge moving from Palmerston North to live at the academy. He played for Western Suburbs in the Central League that features teams from the lower half of the North Island of New Zealand. Just was part of the team to win the Central League  in 2017, as well as runner-up in the 2018 Chatham Cup.

Eastern Suburbs
Just was part of Eastern Suburbs winning New Zealand Football Championship team, that won the final series of the league, qualifying for the OFC Champions League. Just finished the season playing in 20 games, scoring 7 goals.

FC Helsingør
In May 2019, FC Helsingør announced that Just would start at the club 1 July.

AC Horsens
On 1 July 2022, FC Helsingør announced that Just had been sold to AC Horsens.

International career

U-17
Just was part of the New Zealand U-17 team that won the 2017 OFC U-17 Championship, qualifying for the U-17 World Cup in India. Just played all three games the U-17 team played at the World Cup and was team captain in the second game against Paraguay

U-20
Just was originally called up to be part of the New Zealand U-20 side to play at the OFC U-19 Championship in Tahiti but withdraw for club commitments with Western Suburbs. Even though Just didn't play in the OFC U-19 Championship, the team qualified for the U-20 World Cup in Poland and Just was part of the team that travelled to the tournament. He played in 3 games, scoring one goal in their Round of 16 defeat by penalties to Colombia U-20.

National team
On the 15 November 2019, Just made his national team debut for New Zealand in a friendly against Ireland, starting in their 1–3 loss. Just scored his first international goal against Fiji in their 4–0 win during the 2022 FIFA World Cup qualifiers in Qatar.

Career statistics
As of match played 21 March 2022

International 
As of match played 21 March 2022.

International goals
Scores and results list the New Zealand goal tally first.

Honours
Western Suburbs
Central League winners: 2017
2018 Chatham Cup runner-up: 2018

Eastern Suburbs
New Zealand Football Championship champions: 2018–19

New Zealand U17
OFC U-17 Championship: 2017

References

External links

2000 births
Living people
New Zealand association footballers
New Zealand expatriate association footballers
New Zealand youth international footballers
New Zealand international footballers
Association football forwards
Footballers at the 2020 Summer Olympics
Olympic association footballers of New Zealand
New Zealand under-20 international footballers
Western Suburbs FC (New Zealand) players
Eastern Suburbs AFC players
FC Helsingør players
AC Horsens players
Danish 2nd Division players
Danish 1st Division players
New Zealand expatriate sportspeople in Denmark
Expatriate men's footballers in Denmark
New Zealand people of German descent